White Butte is an unincorporated community in Perkins County, in the U.S. state of South Dakota. It is just north of the Grand River National Grassland.

History
A post office called White Butte was established in 1909, and remained in operation until 1960. The community took its name from nearby White Butte.

References

Unincorporated communities in Perkins County, South Dakota
Unincorporated communities in South Dakota